Louis Loeb (November 7, 1866 — July 12, 1909) was a Jewish illustrator in the United States.  In his time, he was one of the best known in his field.  He was also a draftsman, a painter, and a lithographer.

Biography
Born in Cuyahoga County, Ohio to Alexander Loeb, a dry goods merchant, Louis Loeb worked at a Cleveland lithography firm from age 14 onwards, later taking evening classes in sketching at the Cleveland Art Club.  In 1885, he worked at a lithography firm in New York City, with his evenings spent at the Art Students League.

In 1889 he went to Paris to study, under Lefebvre, Constant, and Gérôme, giving up lithography.  After three years he returned to New York, where in 1893 he started work for The Century Magazine as an illustrator.  For the next few years, up until 1900, he was to travel to and from Europe, both for study and in the course of his work for The Century. During the remainder of his life, he stayed in the U.S., dying in Canterbury, New Hampshire.

Works
He won an honorable mention at the Paris Salon in 1895, and a third medal in 1897.  In 1903 his exhibition of oils at the new rooms of the Cooperative Society in New York aroused interest in his later work. He was awarded two silver medals at the Saint Louis Exposition 1904. His best-known works are:
 Temple of the Winds (1898), in the Metropolitan Museum, New York
 The Breeze (1900)
 The Dawn (1903)
 The Siren (1905)
 Eleanor Robson, a portrait (1905)
 Miranda (1906), in the Metropolitan Museum, New York
 The Summit (1907)
 Princess Zomona (1908)

References

Further reading

External links

Retrospective exhibition of paintings by Louis Loeb, an exhibition catalog from The Metropolitan Museum of Art Libraries (fully available online as PDF)

1866 births
1909 deaths
19th-century American painters
American male painters
20th-century American painters
American illustrators
American lithographers
Jewish painters
20th-century American printmakers
19th-century American male artists
20th-century American male artists
20th-century lithographers
Members of the American Academy of Arts and Letters